The FIBA EuroBasket Women 2008 Division C was the tenth edition of the lowest tier of the women's European basketball championship, which is today known as FIBA Women's European Championship for Small Countries. The tournament took place in Luxembourg City, Luxembourg, from 7 to 12 July 2008. Malta women's national basketball team won the tournament for the first time.

Participating teams

First round
In the first round, the teams were drawn into two groups of four. The first two teams from each group advance to the semifinals, the other teams will play in the 5th–8th place playoffs.

Group A

Group B

5th–8th place playoffs

5th–8th place semifinals

7th place match

5th place match

Championship playoffs

Semifinals

3rd place match

Final

Final standings

References

FIBA Women's European Championship for Small Countries
EuroBasket Women 2008 Division C
International sports competitions hosted by Luxembourg
Basketball in Luxembourg
2008 in Luxembourgian sport
July 2008 sports events in Europe